Sigurd Brørs (born 16 July 1968 in Møre og Romsdal) is a Norwegian cross-country skier who competed from 1992 to 1997. His best World Cup finish was third at a 15 km race in Italy in 1992. His club was Surnadal IL.

Cross-country skiing results
All results are sourced from the International Ski Federation (FIS).

World Championships

World Cup

Season standings

Individual podiums

 1 podium

References

External links

1968 births
Living people
Norwegian male cross-country skiers
Sportspeople from Møre og Romsdal